Thaung Su Nyein (born 1977) is a Burmese businessman. He founded Information Matrix, a media company, which publishes 7Day Daily, one of Myanmar's highest circulated news journals. He is the son of Win Aung, a former Burmese foreign minister. He served as 7Day's editor-in-chief. He studied computer science at City College of New York but exited after his 3rd year to return to Myanmar.

He is married to Su Su Soe Nyunt and has 2 sons.

References

Burmese newspaper publishers (people)
Living people
1977 births